Synuchus amamioshimae is a species of ground beetle in the subfamily Harpalinae. It was described by Habu in 1978.

References

Synuchus
Beetles described in 1978